Peltotrupes youngi, known generally as Young's deep digger scarab, is a species of earth-boring scarab beetle in the family Geotrupidae. Other common names include the ocala burrowing scarab and ocala deep digger scarab beetle. It is found in the area of North America.

References

Further reading

 

Geotrupidae
Articles created by Qbugbot
Beetles described in 1955